Data Discovery and Query Builder (DDQB) is a data abstraction technology, developed by IBM, that allows users to retrieve information from a data warehouse, in terms of the user's specific area of expertise instead of SQL.

DDQB serves the user through a web based graphical user interface and configurable data abstraction model (DAM), which contains both an understanding of the user knowledge domain and the database below it.

DDQB uses a set of Eclipse-based customization tooling and can be deployed as a set of Web Services.

See also
 Business Intelligence
 Ad hoc query
 Full text search
 Unstructured information
 Data access
 Information retrieval
 Information science
 Web Services

External links
 Data Virtualization through IBM and Mayo Clinic Collaboration

Related Papers
 W.A. de Landgraaf, Data grids in theory and practice, 2008

Data analysis software
IBM software